Gregor Glas (born 29 April 2001) is a Slovenian professional basketball player for KK Mornar Bar of the Montenegrian Prva A Liga and the Adriatic ABA League. He is a 1.97 m tall shooting guard.

Professional career
Glas started playing professional basketball for Primorska. In August 2018, he attended the Basketball Without Borders Europe camp in Belgrade, Serbia.

On October 24, 2019, he signed with Serbian club Dynamic VIP PAY. Following the 2020–21 season Glas declared for the 2021 NBA draft. On July 19, 2021, he withdrawn his name from consideration for the 2021 NBA draft.

On September 26, 2021, he signed with Serbian powerhouse KK Partizan.

International career
Glas made his debut for the Slovenian national team on September 14, 2018, at the 2019 FIBA Basketball World Cup qualification game against Latvia national team. Glas thereby became the youngest player to ever play for Slovenia on a senior level.

References

External links
 Eurobasket.com profile
 REALGM profile

2001 births
Living people
Sportspeople from Novo Mesto
ABA League players
Basketball League of Serbia players
KK Dynamic players
KK Partizan players
Slovenian men's basketball players
Slovenian expatriate basketball people in Serbia
Shooting guards